Bathytoma is a genus of  deep-water sea snails, marine gastropod mollusks in the family Borsoniidae.

Fossil records
This genus is known in the fossil records from the Paleocene to the Quaternary (age range: from 55.8 to 0.781 million years ago). Fossils are found in the marine strata throughout the world.

Distribution
This marine species occurs in the Eastern Indian Ocean (Madagascar, Mozambique, South Africa); off Indonesia, New Caledonia, Panglao Island, Sulu Sea, Vanuatu, Wallis and Futuna, Bohol, Kerala, New Zealand, Philippines, Sea of Japan; off Australia (New South Wales, Queensland, Victoria, Western Australia). They are all known from deep waters from 100 m to about 1500 m, but usually at 200–700 m.

Description
The lines of specific distinction appear to be drawn narrowly in this genus and to depend chiefly upon sculpture. The novelty appears intimately related to Bathytoma engonia (Watson, 1881)  differing by the sharper keel, more elevated tubercles and generally coarser sculpture.

The biconical or fusiform shell is medium-sized to rather large. Its periphery is smooth or nodose, angulate or keeled. The peripheral anal sinus is deep. The columella is somewhat swollen, sometimes showing a pleat. The paucispiral protoconch consists of 1 to 3 conical or globose whorls, smooth or with faint spiral striae. The operculum has a broadly oblanceolate to ovate shape, with an eccentric to terminal nucleus. The ground color of the shell is white to yellowish-brown.

Their protoconch morphology seems to infer a non-planktotrophic larval development.

Species
Species within the genus Bathytoma include:

 Bathytoma agnata Hedley & Petterd, 1906
 Bathytoma arbucklei Kilburn, 1986
 Bathytoma atractoides (Watson, 1881)
 Bathytoma badifasciata Puillandre, Sysoev, Olivera, Couloux & Bouchet, 2010
 † Bathytoma bartrumi Laws, 1939
 Bathytoma belaeformis (Sowerby III, 1903)
 Bathytoma bitorquata (Martens, 1901)
 Bathytoma boholica Parth, 1994
 Bathytoma carnicolor Puillandre, Sysoev, Olivera, Couloux & Bouchet, 2010
 † Bathytoma cataphracta Brocchi 1814 
 Bathytoma consors Puillandre, Sysoev, Olivera, Couloux & Bouchet, 2010
 † Bathytoma coweorum Beu, 1970
 Bathytoma cranaos Puillandre, Sysoev, Olivera, Couloux & Bouchet, 2010
 † Bathytoma discors Powell, 1942
 Bathytoma engonia (Watson, 1881)
 Bathytoma episoma Puillandre, Sysoev, Olivera, Couloux & Bouchet, 2010
 † Bathytoma filaris (Marwick, 1931)
 † Bathytoma finlayi Laws, 1939 
 Bathytoma fissa (Martens, 1901)
 Bathytoma formosensis Vera-Pelaez, 2004
 † Bathytoma fortinodosa (Marwick, 1931) 
 Bathytoma gabrielae Bozzetti, 2006
 Bathytoma gordonlarki Tucker & Olivera, 2011
 † Bathytoma haasti Hutton 1877 
 † Bathytoma hawera (Laws, 1940) 
 Bathytoma hecatorgnia (Verco, 1907)
 Bathytoma hedlandensis Tippett & Kosuge, 1994
 Bathytoma helenae Kilburn, 1974
 † Bathytoma hokianga Laws, 1947 
 Bathytoma lacertosus (Hedley, 1922)
 Bathytoma luehdorfi (Lischke, 1872)
 † Bathytoma media (Marwick, 1931) 
 † Bathytoma mitchelsoni Powell, 1935
 Bathytoma mitrella (Dall, 1881)
 Bathytoma murdochi Finlay, 1930
 Bathytoma neocaledonica Puillandre, Sysoev, Olivera, Couloux & Bouchet, 2010
 Bathytoma netrion Puillandre, Sysoev, Olivera, Couloux & Bouchet, 2010
 † Bathytoma ngatapa (Marwick, 1931) 
 † Bathytoma nonplicata 
 Bathytoma oldhami (Smith E. A., 1899)
 † Bathytoma pacifica Squires 2001 
 † Bathytoma paracantha (J.E. Tenison-Woods, 1877) 
 Bathytoma paratractoides Puillandre, Sysoev, Olivera, Couloux & Bouchet, 2010
 Bathytoma parengonia (Dell, 1956)
 † Bathytoma paucispiralis (Powell, 1942)
 † Bathytoma pergracilis (Marwick, 1931) 
 † Bathytoma praecisa (Marwick, 1931) 
 † Bathytoma prior (Vella, 1954) 
 † Bathytoma proavita (Powell, 1942) 
 Bathytoma prodicia Kilburn, 1986
 Bathytoma profundis (Laseron, 1954)
 Bathytoma punicea Puillandre, Sysoev, Olivera, Couloux & Bouchet, 2010
 Bathytoma regnans Melvill, 1918
 Bathytoma solomonensis Puillandre, Sysoev, Olivera, Couloux & Bouchet, 2010
 Bathytoma somalica Ardovini, 2015
 Bathytoma stenos Puillandre, Sysoev, Olivera, Couloux & Bouchet, 2010
 † Bathytoma tenuineta (Marwick, 1931) 
 Bathytoma tippetti Vera-Peláez, 2004
 Bathytoma tuckeri Vera-Peláez, 2004
 Bathytoma viabrunnea (Dall, 1889)
 Bathytoma virgo (Okutani, 1966)
 Bathytoma visagei Kilburn, 1973
 † Bathytoma wairarapaensis Vella, 1954

Species brought into synonymy
 Bathytoma biconica Hedley, 1903: synonym of Benthofascis biconica (Hedley, 1903)
 Bathytoma colorata Sysoev & Bouchet, 2001: synonym of Gemmuloborsonia colorata (Sysoev & Bouchet, 2001)
 † Bathytoma condonana F.M. Anderson & B. Martin, 1914: synonym of Megasurcula condonana (F.M. Anderson & B. Martin, 1914)
 † Bathytoma excavata Suter, 1917: synonym of  † Austrotoma excavata (Suter, 1917)
 Bathytoma sulcata excavata Suter, 1917 synonym of  † Austrotoma excavata (Suter, 1917)
 Bathytoma gratiosa Suter, 1908: synonym of Fenestrosyrinx gratiosa (Suter, 1908), synonym of Taranis gratiosa (Suter, 1908)
 Bathytoma sarcinula Hedley, 1905: synonym of Benthofascis sarcinula (Hedley, 1905)
 Bathytoma tremperiana (Dall, 1911): synonym of Megasurcula tremperiana (Dall, 1911)
 Bathytoma tremperiana Dall, 1911: synonym of Megasurcula carpenteriana (Gabb, 1865)
 Subgenus Bathytoma (Parabathytoma) Shuto, 1961 represented as Bathytoma Harris & Burrows, 1891 
 Bathytoma (Parabathytoma) helenae Kilburn, 1974 represented as Bathytoma helenae Kilburn, 1974 
 Bathytoma (Parabathytoma) visagei Kilburn, 1973 represented as Bathytoma visagei Kilburn, 1973

References

 Harris G. F. & Burrows H. W. (1891). The Eocene and Oligocene beds of the Paris basin. Geologists' Association, London 129 pp.: page(s): 113
 Wilson, B. 1994. Australian Marine Shells. Prosobranch Gastropods. Kallaroo, WA : Odyssey Publishing Vol. 2 370 pp.

External links

 
Extant Thanetian first appearances